The Qin Ling Mountains deciduous forests ecoregion (WWF ID: PA0434) covers the Qin Mountains, which run west-to-east across central China.   The mountains effectively divide the biological regions of China into north and south.   To the north is the Yellow River basin, a loess-soil region of temperate deciduous forests.  To the south is the Yangtze River basic, a subtropical forest region.  In between, the Qin Mountains support many rare and endemic species, including the Giant panda and the Sichuan snub-nosed monkey.

Location and description 

The Qin Mountains or Qin Ling Mountains, also called "Nanshan" (Southern Mountains), are the traditional dividing line between northern and southern China. The Daba Mountains run parallel to the main northern ridge of the Qinling, placing the Daba Mountains evergreen forests ecoregion to the south of the Qin Ling ecoregion.

Climate 
The climate of the ecoregion is Humid continental climate, warm summer (Köppen climate classification (Dwb)), with a dry winter. Precipitation averages 850 to 950 mm/year in the Qinling Mountains.

Flora and fauna 
The Qin Ling deciduous forests ecoregion sits on the north-facing ridge of the divide; the Daba Mountains face south.  The Qinling are colder, being more exposed to the climate of northern China.  The forests exhibit altitude zonation, with deciduous forests of oak, elm, walnut, ash and maple at the lowest level.  The middle elevations support a mixed forest of deciduous trees (oak and birch) and evergreen conifers such as Chinese white pine (Pinus armandii).  At higher elevations the forests thin to sub-alpine fir, larch, birch, and rhododendron.

The ecoregion is the eastern range of the Giant panda, and also provides habitat for the endangered Red panda (Ailurus fulgens), and the Chinese snub-nosed monkey (Rhinopithecus roxellana).  A stable population of the Giant panda is found in the Foping National Nature Reserve in the ecoregion.

See also 
 List of ecoregions in China

References 

Palearctic ecoregions
Ecoregions of China
Montane forests
Temperate broadleaf and mixed forests